John Seybold may refer to:

John Seybold (criminal) (a.k.a. Frank Hohimer) (born 1919), former jewel thief and author
John States Seybold (1897–1984), governor of Panama Canal Zone 
John W. Seybold (1916–2004), father of computer typesetting
John Seybold (baker), proprietor of the Seybold Building in Miami, Florida.